Before Became After is a reunion album from the original Kansas II lineup, under their new name of Proto-Kaw. The Special Edition contains three bonus tracks - one new original song, a live version of "Belexes", plus a “single” version of “Words of Honor”. It also includes an informative interview CD-ROM video about the group.

"Greenburg, Glickstein, Charles, David, Smith and Jones" is a cover of a song by The Cryan' Shames from their 1968 album Synthesis.

Track listing
"Alt. More Worlds than Known" – 7:28
"Words of Honor" – 4:28
"Leaven" – 8:26
"Axolotl" – 6:04
"Quantum Leapfrog" – 5:42
"Greenburg, Glickstein, Charles, David, Smith and Jones" (Isaac Guillory, Jim Fairs) – 3:05
"Gloriana" – 9:07
"Occasion of Your Honest Dreaming" – 3:38
"Heavenly Man" – 5:53
"Theophany" – 11:43
 "Belexes" (live) – 8:08
 "It Moves You" – 4:26
 "Words of Honor" (single edit) – 3:18

Personnel
Proto-Kaw
Lynn Meredith - vocals, narration
John Bolton - saxophones, flute
Kerry Livgren - guitars, piano, keyboards, engineer
Dan Wright - organ, keyboards, percussion
Craig Kew - bass, backing vocals
Brad Schulz - drums
Additional musicians
Jake Livgren - backing vocals
Rod Mikinski - bass on "Axolotl"
Eva Peterson - backing vocals on "It Moves You"

Personnel
 Ken Westphal - Design, Illustrations
 Thomas Ewerhard - Design
 Kerrick James - Original Photography
 Barak Hill - Web Design

References
 http://www.allmusic.com/album/before-became-after-mw0000331145

Release details
2005, USA, InsideOut Music SPV08760650, Release date 5 April 2005, CD
2005, USA, InsideOut Music SPV08560652, Release date 5 April 2005, CD Special edition

Proto-Kaw albums
2005 albums